11 Sagittae is a star in the constellation Sagitta. It is a blue giant with a spectral classification of B9III and has evolved off the main sequence. The star will enter the Hertzsprung gap soon.

Naming
It is in the Chinese asterism , or Left Flag which consists of 11 Sagittae, γ Sagittae, α Sagittae, β Sagittae, δ Sagittae, ζ Sagittae, 13 Sagittae, 14 Sagittae and ρ Aquilae.

References

B-type giants
Sagitta (constellation)
Sagittae, 11
189090
7622
098324